Nemətabad, Agdash may refer to:
Aşağı Nemətabad
Yuxarı Nemətabad